Yammihatti is a village in the southern state of Karnataka, India. Yammihatti is located in the Navalgund taluk of Dharwad district in Karnataka.

Demographics
As of the 2011 Census of India there were 166 households in Yammihatti and a total population of 892 consisting of 464 males and 428 females. There were 125 children ages 0-6.

See also
 Dharwad
 Districts of Karnataka

References

External links
 http://Dharwad.nic.in/

Villages in Dharwad district